Vlastislav Antolák (27 April 1942 – 7 March 2023) was a Czech teacher and politician. A member of the Communist Party of Bohemia and Moravia, he served in the Chamber of Deputies from 2002 to 2006.

Antolák died on 7 March 2023, at the age of 80.

References

1942 births
2023 deaths
Czech schoolteachers
Communist Party of Czechoslovakia politicians
Communist Party of Bohemia and Moravia politicians
Members of the Chamber of Deputies of the Czech Republic (2002–2006)
People from the Zlín Region